Balan (also Romanized as Bālān) is a village in Seyyedan Rural District, Abish Ahmad District, Kaleybar County, East Azerbaijan Province, Iran. At the 2006 census, its population was 413, in 90 families.

References 

Populated places in Kaleybar County